This list of museums in Montana encompasses museums which are defined for this context as institutions (including nonprofit organizations, government entities, and private businesses) that collect and care for objects of cultural, artistic, scientific, or historical interest and make their collections or related exhibits available for public viewing. Museums that exist only in cyberspace (i.e., virtual museums) are not included.

The six areas referred to in the "Region" column are explained in a separate section below.

Montana has an unusual number of paleontology museums and museums with paleontology sections, much of them filled with discoveries from within the state. These museums are listed again in a separate table below with more specific information.

Museums
This list is a sortable table. Click on the small boxes next to any heading title to reorder the list (in alphabetical order or reverse alphabetical order) by that category.

Museums with paleontology holdings
This list repeats items in the above list, with more information on fossil dinosaur holdings. Each of the museums on the Montana Dinosaur Trail has "unique paleontology displays, interpretation, replicas or actual skeletons of dinosaurs and other fossils" found in Montana", according to the official Montana Dinosaur Trail web page.

Defunct museums
 Desert John's Saloon Museum, Deer Lodge
 Makoshika Dinosaur Museum, Glendive
 Museum of Fine Arts Butte

Regions
The six regions referred to in the above lists are based on those used by the Montana tourism authority and the Montana Association of Museums. The regions used here have the same boundaries but are renamed here:

 North central ("Russell Country"):
 Prominent communities: Great Falls
 Counties: Cascade, Chouteau, Hill, Judith Basin, Liberty County, Meagher, Pondera, Toole, Wheatland
 Northeast ("Missouri River Country"):
Counties: Blaine, Daniels, Fergus, Garfield, McCone, Petroleum, Phillips, Richland, Roosevelt, Sheridan, Valley
 Northwest ("Glacier Country"):
 Prominent communities: Missoula, Whitefish
 Counties: Flathead, Glacier, Lake, Lincoln, Mineral, Missoula, Ravalli
 South central ("Yellowstone Country"):
 Prominent communities: Bozeman
 Counties: Carbon, Gallatin, Stillwater, Sweet Grass, Park
 Southeast ("Custer Country"):
 Prominent communities: Billings
Counties: Big Horn, Carter, Custer, Dawson, Fallon, Golden, Musselshell, Prairie, Powder River, Rosebud, Treasure, Wibaux, Yellowstone
 Southwest ("Gold West Country"):
 Prominent communities: Helena, Butte
 Counties: Beaverhead, Broadwater, Deer Lodge, Granite, Jefferson, Lewis and Clark, Madison, Powell, Silver Bow

See also
 Nature Centers in Montana

References

External links

 Museums Association of Montana
 Visit Montana - Museums Complete listing of museums with facilities, contact info, directions.
 Montana Dinosaur Trail - museums with focus on paleontology in Montana

Montana
Museums
Museums